Ntoum or Nkan is a town in Estuaire Province in northwestern Gabon. It is the capital of the Komo-Mondah Department. Nkan lies along the N1 road and L106 road, 39.2 kilometres by road east of Libreville and 12.2 kilometres north of Nzamaligue.

Demographics
In the 2013 census it had a population of 51,954. In the 1993 census it had a population of 6,188 and in 2012 an estimated population of 11,754.

Transport
It is served by Nkan Airport.  It is located on the Trans-Gabon Railway and is the proposed junction for the line to the iron ore exporting port of Santa Clara.

Industry
Ntoum has an integrated cement plant.

References

Populated places in Estuaire Province
Komo-Mondah Department
Gabon geography articles needing translation from French Wikipedia